is a passenger railway station located in the city of Tsuyama, Okayama Prefecture, Japan, operated by West Japan Railway Company (JR West).

Lines

Station layout
The station consists of one ground-level side platform serving a single bi-directional track. It used have an island platform and side platform for one siding track, but in 1997 these facilities were removed, leaving the side platform connected to the station building by a level crossing. The station is unattended.

Adjacent stations

History
Mimasaka-Kawai Station opened on September 12, 1931. With the privatization of the Japan National Railways (JNR) on April 1, 1987, the station came under the aegis of the West Japan Railway Company.

Passenger statistics
In fiscal 2019, the station was used by an average of 11 passengers daily..

Surrounding area
 Okayama Prefectural Road/Tottori Prefectural Road No. 6 Tsuyama Chizu Hatto Line
 Okayama Prefectural Road/Tottori Prefectural Road No. 118 Kamoyose Line
 Okayama Prefectural Road 208 Mimasaka Kawai Station Line

See also
List of railway stations in Japan

References

External links

  Mimasaka-Kawai Station Official Site

Railway stations in Okayama Prefecture
Railway stations in Japan opened in 1931
Tsuyama